The 1720s BC was a decade lasting from January 1, 1729 BC to December 31, 1720 BC.

Events and trends
 c. 1720 BC–The Hyksos invade and conquer Egypt, establishing their capital at Avaris.
 c. 1720 BC–Adasi, a native king of Assyria, seizes power.

Significant people
Hammurabi, ruler of Babylon beginning in 1728 BC (according to the short chronology)
Samsu-iluna, king of Babylon since 1750 BC (using the middle chronology)
Rim-Sin I, ruler of the city-state of Larsa
Adasi, usurper king of Assyria

References

18th century BC